George Leo Doyle (12 July 1902 – 26 October 1940) was an Australian politician.

He was born in Hobart. In 1937 he was elected to the Tasmanian House of Assembly as a Nationalist member for Franklin. He held the seat until his death in 1940.

References

1902 births
1940 deaths
Nationalist Party of Australia members of the Parliament of Tasmania
Members of the Tasmanian House of Assembly
20th-century Australian politicians